The 1989–90 FIBA Women's European Champions Cup was the 32nd edition of FIBA Europe's competition for national champions women's basketball clubs, running from September 1989 to 29 March 1990. Libertas Trogylos Basket defeated 1989 Ronchetti Cup champion CSKA Moscow in the final, played in Cesena, to become the fourth Italian club to win the competition. Red Star Belgrade and BAC Mirande were third and fourth respectively.

Qualifying round

Round of 12

Group stage

Final

References

Champions Cup
EuroLeague Women seasons